The 2011–12 Cyclo-Cross is made up by the three main competitions of Cyclo-Cross discipline: 
World Cup
Superprestige
GvA Trophy

The season began on 9 October with the Cyclo-cross Ruddervoorde, won by Niels Albert. It is scheduled to end on 19 February 2012.

Race calendar

National Championships

See also
2012 UCI Cyclo-cross World Championships
2010–2011 cyclo-cross season

2011 in cyclo-cross
2012 in cyclo-cross
Cyclo-cross by year